Solong, also known as Arawe (Arove), is an Austronesian language of West New Britain, Papua New Guinea.

References

Arawe languages
Languages of West New Britain Province